Dr. Sampurnanand Medical College (or SNMC by its students and alumni) is  a government medical college situated in the city Jodhpur of Indian state Rajasthan which was established in 1965. It celebrated the completion of its Golden Jubilee in 2015.

History
It was established in 1965. In 1974–75 postgraduate course were also started. Presently post graduation is available in 19 different fields. It serves the population of western Rajasthan. Every year about 250 students enter MBBS course via NEET UG. Entrance to post graduate courses are via Rajasthan PrePG and All India Pre PG Exam.

It serves as leading trauma center and tertiary care center in the western Rajasthan. The following hospitals are attached to it :
Mahatma Gandhi hospital (MGH): General hospital
Ummed Mahila and Shishu chikitsalaya: Children's  & Women's Hospital
K. N. Chest Hospital: Specialized TB & Chest hospital
Mathura Das Mathur hospital (MDM) (also called as New Teaching hospital): General Hospital

References

Medical colleges in Jodhpur
Medical colleges in Rajasthan
Educational institutions established in 1965
1965 establishments in Rajasthan
Affiliates of Rajasthan University of Health Sciences